The 2012 Speedway Grand Prix of Great Britain, also known as the 2012 FIM Fogo British Speedway Grand Prix for sponsorship reasons, was the ninth race of the 2012 Speedway Grand Prix season. It took place on 25 August at the Millennium Stadium in Cardiff, Wales, United Kingdom.

The Grand Prix was won by Chris Holder who beat Krzysztof Kasprzak, Antonio Lindbäck and Fredrik Lindgren in the final. 1950 and 1953 World Champion Freddie Williams, Wales' only Speedway World Champion, presented the winners trophy to Holder.

Riders 
The Speedway Grand Prix Commission nominated Scott Nicholls as Wild Card, and Ben Barker and Craig Cook both as Track Reserves. Injured Craig Cook (carpus broken) was replaced by Josh Auty. Injured Jarosław Hampel and Kenneth Bjerre was replaced by first and second Qualified Substitutes, Martin Vaculík and Krzysztof Kasprzak. The draw was made on 24 August.
 (3)  Jarosław Hampel → (19)  Martin Vaculík
 (7)  Kenneth Bjerre → (20)  Krzysztof Kasprzak
 (18)  Craig Cook → (18)  Josh Auty

Heat details

Heat after heat 
 (55,2) Lindbäck, Hancock, Sayfutdinov, Kasprzak
 (54,3) N.Pedersen, Holder, Jonsson, Gollob
 (54,6) Vaculík, Crump, B.Pedersen, Ljung
 (55,3) Andersen, Nicholls, Harris, Lindgren
 (54,9) Hancock, Nicholls, Jonsson, B.Pedersen
 (55,2) Andersen, Crump, N.Pedersen, Lindbäck
 (55,6) Kasprzak, Vaculík, Gollob, Harris
 (55,9) Holder, Sayfutdinov, Lindgren, Ljung
 (56,2) N.Pedersen, Lindgren, Hancock, Vaculík
 (56,1) Jonsson, Lindbäck, Harris, Ljung
 (56,2) Holder, Andersen, B.Pedersen, Kasprzak
 (56,3) Gollob, Sayfutdinov, Nicholls, Crump (X)
 (55,6) Gollob, Andersen, Hancock, Ljung
 (55,3) Holder, Lindbäck, Nicholls, Vaculík
 (55,7) Lindgren, Kasprzak, Crump, Jonsson
 (55,8) Sayfutdinov, Harris, N.Pedersen, B.Pedersen
 (55,5) Holder, Harris, Crump, Hancock (R)
 (55,9) Lindgren, Gollob, Lindbäck, B.Pedersen
 (56,3) N.Pedersen, Kasprzak, Nicholls, Ljung
 (56,2) Sayfutdinov, Vaculík, Jonsson, Andersen (R)
 Semifinals
 (55,5) Holder, Lindbäck, Gollob, Andersen
 (55,9) Lindgren, Kasprzak, Sayfutdinov, N.Pedersen
 the Final
 (55,7) Holder, Kasprzak, Lindbäck, Lindgren

The intermediate classification

References

See also 
 motorcycle speedway

Great Britain
Speedway Grand Prix of Great Britain
Speedway Grand Prix of Great Britain
Speedway Grand Prix of Great Britain
Speedway Grand Prix of Great Britain